The Roewe 350 is a small family car or compact car produced by Roewe in China onwards from 2010,the 2.0 liter turbo engine produces 247 hp and goes from 0-100 in 4.8 seconds, this type of engine can only be found in the middle east and in China. the 1.5 liter engine is sold in international markets and produces 146 hp MG 350. Codenamed AP11, it shares the same automotive platform with the MG 5 hatchback, which entered production in 2011 as a 2012 model.

Overview
The Roewe 350 debuted in concept car form at the 2009 Shanghai Auto Show as the Roewe N1, and was officially launched at the Beijing Auto Show in 2010 with a SAIC developed 1.5 L engine. The 350 is produced at a former Nanjing Automobile production base in Pukou. The price in China MSRP (Yuan) is from 89,700 to 124,700 (13,180 to US$18,320).

MG 350
The MG 350 offered in the Gulf Cooperation Council of the Middle East regional market is essentially a rebadged Roewe 350 offered in China. The MG 350 features a restyled front grill with the MG badge and slightly different tail lamp lenses. The MG 350 comes with a 1.5 litre 4-cylinder engine producing 107 hp and 135 Nm of torque mated to a 4-speed automatic gearbox. The MG 350 available in European markets is the first production car in the world with an Android operating System and 3G Internet access, with engine options including a 1.5 liter turbo engine producing 129 hp and a 1.5 liter engine producing 109 hp.

Controversies with Ssangyong Motors
Originally it was planned as the B100 project from Ssangyong Motor. It started development in 2006, to compete with the Hyundai Elantra and other compact cars in Korea. SAIC developed the Roewe 350 as the production version, but it never launched in the Korean market. SAIC planned for Ssangyong and its Korean partners to develop their version as subcontractors.

References

External links

 Roewe Website 

350
Cars introduced in 2010
Compact cars
Cars of China